WIRP-LD, virtual channel 27 (VHF digital channel 10), is a low-powered Estrella TV-affiliated television station serving the Research Triangle of North Carolina that is licensed to Raleigh. The station is a ShopHQ affiliate owned by DTV America Corporation.

Digital channels 
The station's digital signal is multiplexed:

History 
The station's construction permit was granted by the Federal Communications Commission on May 17, 2011. The originally assigned callsign was W22ED-D. The stations current WIRP-LD calls were assigned on May 10, 2013.

The station went on the air in early 2016 as an affiliate of Estrella TV licensed to Fayetteville, North Carolina. Since in-market sister station WNCB-LD, also in Fayetteville, the station's main channel is mainly a simulcast of WNCB. The other subchannels of WIRP are different from that station as WNCB carries Azteca America, Sonlife, and Newsmax TV networks on their subchannels, while Estrella, Azteca America, Shop LC, Heroes & Icons, Soul of the South, Movies! and the main feed of QVC are offered on the subchannels of WIRP. The main QVC feed is also offered on WNCB-LD5.

References

External links

DTV America

Innovate Corp.
Buzzr affiliates
Ion Mystery affiliates
Estrella TV affiliates
IRP-LD
Television channels and stations established in 2016
Low-power television stations in the United States
Movies! affiliates
Heroes & Icons affiliates